Gisburn Forest is a civil parish in Ribble Valley, Lancashire, England.  It contains ten listed buildings that are recorded in the National Heritage List for England.  All of the listed buildings are designated at Grade II, the lowest of the three grades, which is applied to "buildings of national importance and special interest".  The parish contains the small village of Tosside, and is otherwise entirely rural.  Most of the listed buildings are houses, farmhouses and farm buildings.  The other listed buildings are a church, a chapel, and a public house.

Buildings

References

Citations

Sources

Lists of listed buildings in Lancashire
Buildings and structures in Ribble Valley